Christopher Gray is a British choral conductor and organist who served as Organist and Master of the Choristers at Truro Cathedral from 2008 to 2023 before being appointed Director of Music at St John's College, Cambridge.

Early life and education
Gray grew up in Bangor in Northern Ireland and was assistant organist at St George's Church, Belfast, before moving to England at the age of 18 for an organ scholarship at Pembroke College, Cambridge, where he studied with Nicolas Kynaston and David Sanger. As a postgraduate student at the Royal College of Music, he was taught by Margaret Phillips and held an organ scholarship at Guildford Cathedral, working with Stephen Farr and Geoffrey Morgan.

Career
Gray was appointed Assistant Director of Music at Truro Cathedral in 2000 and Organist and Master of the Choristers in 2008. During his time there he was responsible for six choral services each week and oversaw the introduction of a girls' choir to complement the existing boys' choir.

With the cathedral choristers, Gray appeared on the ITV television programme Britain's Got Talent in 2019, singing "Can You Feel the Love Tonight", which was composed by Elton John for the animated film The Lion King. He also directed the Three Spires Singers and Orchestra as well as community and youth choirs in Cornwall.

In 2022 it was announced that he would succeed Andrew Nethsingha as Director of Music at St John's College, Cambridge, in 2023.

Gray has appeared as an organist in live radio and television broadcasts and on eight CD recordings, two of which were recommended as editor's choices by Gramophone magazine.

References

Living people
People from Bangor, County Down
Alumni of Pembroke College, Cambridge
Alumni of the Royal College of Music
British male organists
21st-century organists
British male conductors (music)
Year of birth missing (living people)